The Republic of Poland Ambassador to Iceland is the Poland's foremost diplomatic representative in Iceland, and head of the Poland's diplomatic mission in Iceland.

History 
Iceland recognised Poland in 1922, however first diplomatic relations were established in 1946. In 1951, Poland opened Consulate General in Reykjavík, which after the year was elevated to the rank of the embassy. Embassy was open until 1981, when diplomatic relations between Poland's communist government and Iceland's government deteriorated due to the introduction of Martial law in Poland by communists. From 1981, Poland Ambassador to Norway was also accredited to Iceland. In 2008 Polish Government opened Consulate General in Reykjavík which was transformed into embassy in 2014.

List of ambassadors of Poland to Iceland 

 2013-2017: Lech Mastalerz (chargé d’affaires)
 since 2017: Gerard Pokruszyński

See also 

 Iceland–Poland relations

References 

Iceland
Poland